The San Jose Sharks are a professional ice hockey team based in San Jose, California. The team is a member of the Pacific Division in the Western Conference of the National Hockey League (NHL). Established for the 1991–92 NHL season, the Sharks initially played games at the Cow Palace before moving to SAP Center at San Jose in 1993. The team has had five general managers since their inception.

Key

General managers

Notes
 A running total of the number of general managers of the franchise. Thus any general manager who has two or more separate terms as general manager is only counted once.

See also
List of NHL general managers

References

San Jose Shakrs
General managers
San Jose Sharks general managers